Andriy Bohdanovych Skvaruk (born 9 March 1967 in Brodivsky, Lviv) is a retired hammer thrower from Ukraine, whose personal best throw is , achieved in April 2002 in Koncha-Zaspa.

Achievements

External links

1967 births
Living people
Ukrainian male hammer throwers
Athletes (track and field) at the 1996 Summer Olympics
Athletes (track and field) at the 2000 Summer Olympics
Olympic athletes of Ukraine
World Athletics Championships medalists